Theodor Meron,  (born 28 April 1930) is an Israeli-American judge. He served as a judge of the International Criminal Tribunal for the former Yugoslavia (ICTY), International Criminal Tribunal for Rwanda (ICTR), and the International Residual Mechanism for Criminal Tribunals (Mechanism). He served as President of the ICTY four times (2002-2005 and 2011–15) and inaugural President of the Mechanism for three terms (2012–19).

Early life
Born in Kalisz, Poland, to a Jewish family. Meron received his legal education at the Hebrew University (M.J.), Harvard Law School (LL.M., J.S.D.) and Cambridge University (Diploma in Public International Law). He immigrated to the United States in 1978 and is a citizen of the United States .

Legal career
Prior to his immigration to the United States, Meron was a legal adviser of the Israeli Ministry of Foreign Affairs. Starting in 1977, he has served as a Professor of International Law at the Geneva Graduate Institute of International Studies, a visiting professor at Harvard Law School and UC Berkeley, and a Professor of International Law at New York University School of Law, where he was named the Charles L. Denison Chair at New York University School of Law in 1994. In 2000-01 he served as Counselor on International Law in the U.S. Department of State. In 2006 he was named Charles L. Denison Professor Emeritus and Judicial Fellow at New York University School of Law. He has been a visiting professor at Oxford University since 2014, a visiting fellow at Mansfield College, and an academic associate at the Bonavero Human Rights Institute. In May 2019, he was elected Honorary Visiting Fellow of Trinity College, Oxford.

In 1990, Meron served as a “Public Member” of the United States Delegation to the CSCE Conference on Human Dimensions in Copenhagen. In 1998, he served as a member of U.S. Delegation to the Rome Conference on the establishment of an International Criminal Court. He served on several committees of experts of the ICRC, on Internal Strife, on Environment and Armed Conflicts, and on Customary Rules of International Humanitarian Law. He co-leads the annual ICRC-NYU seminars on international humanitarian law for UN diplomats.

Meron is a member of the Institute of International Law and the Council on Foreign Relations and is a former Honorary President of the American Society of International Law. He has also served as Co-Editor-in-Chief of the American Journal of International Law. He was awarded the 2005 Rule of Law Award by the International Bar Association and the 2006 Manley O. Hudson Medal of the American Society of International Law.

He was made an Officer of the Legion of Honor by the President of the French Republic in 2007. He received the Charles Homer Haskins Prize of the American Council of Learned Societies for 2008. In 2009, Meron was elected to the American Academy of Arts and Sciences. He was awarded a LLD honoris causa by the University of Warsaw in 2011 and in 2017 he was made Officer of the Order of Merit of Poland. He was also named "Grand Officier" of the National Order of Merit by the President of France in 2014. For service to criminal justice and international Humanitarian Law, Queen Elizabeth II made him an Honorary Companion of "the Most Distinguished Order of St. Michael and St. George" (CMG) in 2019. That same year, he was also one of 17 honorees selected by One Young World and Vanity Fair for the inaugural Global Achievements List, cited for his contributions "for peace, justice and strong institutions" (UK March 2019 issue).

Legal opinion on settlements in the occupied territories 
In the late 1960s, Meron was legal counsel to the Israeli Foreign Ministry and wrote a secret 1967 memo for Prime Minister Levi Eshkol, who was considering creating an Israeli settlement at Kfar Etzion. This was just after Israel's victory in the Six-Day War of June 1967. Meron's memo concluded that creating new settlements in the Occupied Territories would be a violation of the Fourth Geneva Convention. Eshkol created the settlements anyway. Fifty years later, in 2017, Meron, citing decades of legal scholarship on the subject, reiterated his legal opinion regarding the illegality of Israeli settlements in the Occupied Territories.

Judicial services

ICTY 
In June 2013, Judge Frederik Harhoff of Denmark, a judge at the ICTY, circulated a letter saying that Meron had pressured other judges into acquitting Serb and Croat commanders. The letter claimed Meron had raised the degree of responsibility that senior military leaders should bear for war crimes committed by their subordinates, to the point where it a conviction has become nearly impossible. They blamed Meron, whom they identified as an American, for the acquittals of top Serb and Croat commanders.

In August 2013, a chamber appointed by the ICTY Vice-President found by majority that Judge Harhoff had demonstrated an unacceptable appearance of bias in favour of conviction. Harhoff was therefore disqualified from the case of Vojislav Šešelj. The decision followed a defence motion seeking the disqualification of Harhoff on the basis of Judge Harhoff's letter. Following the decision on his disqualification for bias, Harhoff, who was an ad litem judge, had to leave the ICTY.

In the Judgment of the International Court of Justice of 3 February 2015, the Court, which is the principal judicial organ of the United Nations, expressed agreement with the ICTY majority judgement in the case of Ante Gotovina and Mladen Markač, which was at the center of Harhoff's criticism of Meron, who presided over the Gotovina and Markač appeal.

The National Commission for the Fight against Genocide (CNLG) of Rwanda called for the resignation of Meron, who was accused of influencing court decisions by exerting undue influence on judges to let high-profile war crimes suspects go free. The Executive Secretary of the CNLG, Jean de Dieu Mucyo, has stated permitting these decisions could have "disastrous consequences for the current and future cases of international war crimes, for truth and justice in the world, for peace and tolerance, and for human rights and freedoms."

Meron and other judges reversed convictions and reduced considerably the sentences of Col. Theoneste Bagosora, who is accused of masterminding the 1994 Hutu Genocide against the Tutsi, which resulted in 800,000 to 1 million deaths, from life in prison to 35 years. The judges reduced the sentence of the second in command, Lt. Col. Anatole Nsengiyumva, from life to time served (15 years); he was released June 2013. Meron was accused of leading acquittals of Hutus Protais Zigiranyirazo in November 2009 and, recently, Justin Mugenzi and Prosper Mugiraneza, all senior officials of the genocidal regime.

Honors 
In 2019, Meron was appointed Honorary Companion of the Order of St Michael and St George (CMG), for services to criminal justice and international humanitarian law. On 1 April 2022 the appointment was made substantive.

Works
Meron's books include:
 Investment Insurance in International Law (Oceana-Sijthoff, 1976)
 The United Nations Secretariat (Lexington Books, 1977)
 Human Rights in International Law (Oxford University Press, 1984)
 Human Rights Law-Making in the United Nations (Oxford University Press, 1986; awarded the certificate of merit of the American Society of International Law)
 Human Rights in Internal Strife: Their International Protection (Sir Hersch Lauterpacht Memorial Lectures, Grotius Publications, 1987)
 Human Rights and Humanitarian Norms as Customary Law (Oxford University Press, 1989)
 Henry's Wars and Shakespeare's Laws (Oxford University Press, 1993)
 Bloody Constraint: War and Chivalry in Shakespeare (Oxford University Press, 1998)
 War Crimes Law Comes of Age: Essays (Oxford University Press, 1998)
 International Law In the Age of Human Rights (Martinus Nijhoff, 2004)
 The Humanization of International Law (Hague Academy of International Law and Nijhoff, 2006); 
 The Making of International Justice: A View from the Bench, appeared in 2011 (Oxford University Press).

Meron is among the editors of Humanizing the Laws of War: Selected Writings of Richard Baxter (Oxford University Press 2013).

Lectures
Reflections on the Prosecution of War Crimes by International Tribunals: A Historical Perspective in the Lecture Series of the United Nations Audiovisual Library of International Law

References

External links
Official web page at New York University
A Life of Legal Principle, Not of Politics – An Interview with Theodor Meron, July 2016

1930 births
Living people
People from Kalisz
20th-century Polish Jews
American lawyers
Harvard Law School alumni
Presidents of the International Criminal Tribunal for the former Yugoslavia
International Criminal Tribunal for Rwanda judges
Officiers of the Légion d'honneur
New York University School of Law faculty
Academic staff of the Graduate Institute of International and Development Studies
International law scholars
American judges of United Nations courts and tribunals
Companions of the Order of St Michael and St George
American Journal of International Law editors
Polish emigrants to the United States
Members of the Institut de Droit International